Sisters in Arms is a 1918 British silent short film directed by Walter West and starring Violet Hopson, Hazel Jones and Hilda Bayley. It was made to boost female recruitment into the Armed Forces during the First World War.

Cast
 Violet Hopson as WRAF Girl  
 Hazel Jones as WRNS Girl  
 Hilda Bayley as WAAC Girl

References

Bibliography
 Palmer, Scott. British Film Actors' Credits, 1895-1987. McFarland, 1998.

External links
 

1918 films
British silent short films
Films directed by Walter West
British black-and-white films
1910s English-language films